Pleased to Meet You may refer to:

Music
 Pleased to Meet You, documentary video about the making of Harmonium by Vanessa Carlton

Albums
 Pleased to Meet You (James album)
 Pleased to Meet You (Sleeper album)
 Pleased to Meet You, by Hank Jones
 Pleased to Meet You, by MercyMe

Songs
 "Pleased to Meet You", by Aneiki
 "Pleased to Meet You", by Bill Frisell from Gone, Just Like a Train
 "Pleased to Meet You", by James from Pleased to Meet You
 "Pleased to Meet You", by Japanther from Leather Wings
 "Pleased to Meet You", by Wolfmother from Music from and Inspired by Spider-Man 3

Other uses
 Pleased to Meet You, short-story collection by Caroline Adderson
 Pleased to Meet You, comedy programme on BBC Radio 7

See also
 "Sympathy for the Devil", by The Rolling Stones whose chorus begins with the line "pleased to meet you"
 "Song 2", 1997 song by Blur, the lyrics of which contain the phrase "pleased to meet you"